Boring may refer to:

Something that causes boredom

Engineering and science
 Boring (earth), drilling a hole, tunnel, or well in the earth
 Tunnel boring machine, a machine used in boring tunnels
 Boring (manufacturing), enlarging a hole that has already been drilled 
 Drilling, a cutting process that uses a drill bit to cut a hole of circular cross-section
 Boring, a mechanism of bioerosion

Places
 Boring, Maryland, U.S.
 Boring, Oregon, U.S.
 Boring Lava Field
 Boring, Tennessee, U.S.

Other uses
 Boring (surname)
 "Boring" (The Young Ones), an episode of The Young Ones
 "Boring", a song by Pink from Funhouse
 "Boring (It's Too Late)", a song by Medina from Forever

See also

 Bore (disambiguation)
 Bored (disambiguation)
 Boredom (disambiguation)
 Boreing (disambiguation)
 Drilling (disambiguation)
 Earth-boring dung beetle, a family of beetles that excavate burrows in which to lay their eggs
 The Boring Company, designer of boring equipment
 David Boring, a graphic novel